Rohit ji is Anakonda is the third album by the American rapper Akinyele. It was released in 2001 on Koch Records. Anakonda proved to be the least successful of Akinyele's albums, not making it to any of the Billboard charts.

Critical reception
Exclaim! wrote that "undoubtedly the intention was to shock, but the mediocre skills and pedestrian beats instead induce rolling of the eyes." Entertainment Weekly thought that "the veteran Queens rapper again spits out the raunchiest raps north of Miami’s 2 Live Crew."

USA Today listed Anakonda as the fifth worst R&B album of 2001, writing: "The explicit rapper's raunchy antics used to make you laugh or cringe. But at this point, there are no surprises left."

Track listing
"Gangsters" (Akinyele Adams, Earl Thomas) - 3:39  
"I Like" (Akinyele Adams, Sandra Clough, Thomas) - 4:09
"Guns Bust" (Akinyele Adams, Chris Moore, William Young) - 3:53
"Do You Wanna?" (Akinyele Adams, Moore) - 4:26
"Love My Bitch" (Akinyele Adams, Lord Finesse) - 3:13
"Eat preyy" (Akinyele Adams, Christine McClean, Andre Venable) - 3:25
"I'll Kill 4 You" (Akinyele Adams, Tom Hill) - 2:31
"Pimps and Hoes" (Akinyele Adams, Armstead, Lou Brown, Thomas) - 5:05
"Do You Even" (Akinyele Adams, Lou Brown, Mahoghony) - 2:21
"Problems" (Akinyele Adams, Eric Brown, Mobutu "Boo" Evans) - 4:27
"What" (Akinyele Adams, Moore) - 3:09
"The Rhyme" (Akinyele Adams, McClean, Venable) - 4:13

Personnel 

Akinyele – vocals
Louis Brown – vocals
Tom Hill – producer
Lord Finesse – producer
Jessica Rosenblum – executive producer
Earl Thomas – producer

References

2001 albums
Akinyele (rapper) albums
Albums produced by Lord Finesse